Bad President is a 2020 American fantasy comedy film directed by Param Gill and starring Jeff Rector and Eddie Griffin. The film is produced by Param Gill, Deepak Singh and Robert Amico.

Cast
Jeff Rector as Donald Trump
Eddie Griffin as the Devil
Stormy Daniels as herself
Becca Buckalew
Robert Amico
Dawna Lee Heising

Release
The film was released on VOD on October 12, 2020.

Reception
Bobby LePire of Film Threat gave the film a 7 out of 10.

References

External links
 
 
 

American fantasy comedy films
2020s fantasy comedy films
2020 comedy films
2020s English-language films
2020s American films